Cinabra is a genus of moths in the family Saturniidae first described by Léon Sonthonnax in 1901.

Species
Cinabra bracteata (Distant, 1897)
Cinabra hyperbius (Westwood, 1881)
Cinabra kitalei Bouvier, 1930

References

Saturniinae